SPTO may refer to:

 South Pacific Tourism Organisation
 Spanish Patent and Trademark Office